The Class C59 is a type of 4-6-2 steam locomotive built by Japanese National Railways. The C classification indicates three sets of driving wheels. The C59 could haul 17 passenger cars. World War II limited their use as express trains, a function for which they were designed. C59s were transferred to Kyushu after electrification of the trunk lines after the war. They were rebuilt into 47 Class C60 Hudson Rebuilds between 1953 and 1961 at the railway's Hamamatsu works and Koriyama works.  In 1970, the locomotives were retired. Only three are preserved. C59 1 is preserved at the Kyushu Railway History Museum on display. C59 164 is preserved at the Kyoto Railway Museum. C59 161 is preserved at the Hiroshima Children’s Museum. They were designed by Hideo Shima .

See also
 Japan Railways locomotive numbering and classification
JNR Class C60 Hudson’s
JNR Class C61 Hudson’s
JNR Class C62 Hudson’s

References

4-6-2 locomotives
Steam locomotives of Japan
1067 mm gauge locomotives of Japan
Passenger locomotives